Nerylon Ferreira de Oliveira  (born 15 January 1988 in São Luís), simply known as Nerylon, is a Brazilian footballer. Mainly a right back, he can also play as a right midfielder or winger.

References

External links

1988 births
Living people
Brazilian footballers
Association football defenders
Campeonato Brasileiro Série A players
Campeonato Brasileiro Série B players
Associação Atlética Ponte Preta players
Sport Club do Recife players
Fortaleza Esporte Clube players
Campinense Clube players
Uberaba Sport Club players
Atlético Monte Azul players
Associação Portuguesa de Desportos players
Clube Atlético Juventus players
Boavista Sport Club players
Associação Atlética Portuguesa (Santos) players
FC Etar 1924 Veliko Tarnovo players
Expatriate footballers in Bulgaria
Brazilian expatriate sportspeople in Bulgaria
First Professional Football League (Bulgaria) players

Association football midfielders